YMM may refer to:

 Fort McMurray International Airport, by IATA code
 YMM registers in the x86 microprocessor instruction set Advanced Vector Extensions
 Maay Maay language (ISO 639-3 code ymm)